Bradley Hughes may refer to:
 Bradley Hughes (golfer) (born 1967), Australian golfer
 Bradley T. Hughes, programmer and developer of the Blackbox window manager
 B. Wayne Hughes (born 1933), American businessman, founder of Public Storage